Rybinsky District is an administrative and municipal district (raion), one of the forty-three in Krasnoyarsk Krai, Russia. It is located in the southeast of the krai and borders with Kansky District in the northeast, Irbeysky District in the southeast, Sayansky District in the south, Partizansky District in the southwest, Uyarsky District in the west, and with Sukhobuzimsky District in the northwest. Its administrative center is the town of Zaozyorny. Population:  21,186 (2002 Census);  The population of Zaozyorny accounts for 33.4% of the district's total population.

Geography
The Kan River flows through the district.

History
The district was founded on April 4, 1924.

Government
As of 2013, the Head of the district and the Chairman of the District Council is Sergey M. Kolesov.

References

Notes

Sources

Districts of Krasnoyarsk Krai
States and territories established in 1924